This is a list of all personnel changes for the 2018 EuroLeague off-season and 2018–19 EuroLeague season (until 28 February 2019).

Retirements
The following players who played in the 2017–18 Euroleague, and played more than three EuroLeague seasons, retired.

Managerial changes

Player movements

Between two EuroLeague teams

To a EuroLeague team

Leaving a EuroLeague team

References

External links

Transactions
EuroLeague transactions